Year 201 (CCI) was a common year starting on Thursday (link will display the full calendar) of the Julian calendar. At the time, it was known as the Year of the Consulship of Fabianus and Arrius (or, less frequently, year 954 Ab urbe condita). The denomination 201 for this year has been used since the early medieval period, when the Anno Domini calendar era became the prevalent method in Europe for naming years.

Events 
<onlyinclude>

By place

Roman Empire 
 Lucius Annius Fabianus and Marcus Nonius Arrius Mucianus become Roman Consuls.

China 
 Battle of Cangting: Warlord Cao Cao defeats his rival, Yuan Shao.

By topic

Religion 
 November – A flood in Edessa destroys a Christian church, killing over 2,000 people.

Births 
 Decius, Roman emperor (d. 251)

Deaths 
 Galen, Greek physician (see 210) (b. 129)
 Zhao Qi, Chinese official and scholar

References